The 2008 edition of Copa del Rey de Balonmano takes place in Zaragoza, city of the autonomous community of Aragon. This tournament is played by the 8 first of the Liga ASOBAL when reach the half of the league.

All matches will be played in Pabellón Príncipe Felipe with capacity of 8,300 seats.

2007-08 participants
BM Ciudad Real
FC Barcelona Handbol
Portland San Antonio
CB Ademar León
CAI BM Aragón
BM Valladolid
JD Arrate
BM Antequera

Quarter finals
16 April 2008:

(1) BM Ciudad Real 30-22 (8) CB Antequera: (19:00, CEST) (Official Match Report)

(3) CB Ademar León 26-34 (7) JD Arrate: (21:00, CEST) (Official Match Report)

17 April 2008:

(4) Portland San Antonio 40-30 (5) BM Valladolid: (19:00, CEST) (Official Match Report)

(2) FC Barcelona Handbol 37-34 (6) CAI BM Aragón: (21:00, CEST) (CET) (Official Match Report)

SemiFinals
18 April 2008:

(2) FC Barcelona Handbol 31-29 (4) Portland San Antonio: (18:00, CEST) (Official Match Report)

(1) BM Ciudad Real 34-31 (7) JD Arrate: (20:00, CEST) (Official Match Report)

Final
19 April 2008:

(1) BM Ciudad Real 31-30 (2) FC Barcelona Handbol: (18:00, CEST) (Official Match Report)

Copa del Rey de Balonmano 2007/08 Champion: BM Ciudad Real.

Television Broadcasting
TVE2
Teledeporte.
Aragón Televisión

Organizer
Liga ASOBAL 
Ayuntamiento de Zaragoza 
Gobierno de Aragón 
Zaragoza Deporte 
Expo Zaragoza 2008

External links
2007/2008 Copa del Rey Official Website
Zaragoza tourism site Official Website

Copa del Rey de Balonmano seasons
Copa